A penumbral lunar eclipse will take place on Thursday, June 5, 2031.

Related lunar eclipses

Lunar year series

Saros series 

This is the first lunar eclipse of Saros series 150. The next occurrence will also be a penumbral eclipse on June 15, 2049.

Partial eclipses in series 150 will occur between 2157 Aug 20 and past the year 3000. Total eclipses will occur between 2572 Apr 29 - 2770 Aug 28.

See also 
List of lunar eclipses and List of 21st-century lunar eclipses

Notes

External links 
 

2031-06
2031-06
2031 in science